Mauro Lucas dos Santos Alonso (born August 12, 1988), commonly known as Mauro Alonso, is a Brazilian football midfielder.

Career
Mauro Alonso began playing football for América Futebol Clube (SP). He won title with BATE Borisov in 2010 in the Belarusian Premier League.

References

External links
 

Living people
1988 births
Brazilian footballers
América Futebol Clube (SP) players
FC BATE Borisov players
FK Ekranas players
Expatriate footballers in Lithuania
Association football midfielders
Liga I players
First Professional Football League (Bulgaria) players
FC Brașov (1936) players
FC Lyubimets players
Expatriate footballers in Romania
Brazilian expatriate sportspeople in Romania
Expatriate footballers in Bulgaria
Brazilian expatriate sportspeople in Bulgaria
Barretos Esporte Clube players
Expatriate footballers in Belarus
Brazilian expatriate footballers
Expatriate footballers in Portugal
Atlético Monte Azul players
Expatriate footballers in Libya
Al-Ittihad Club (Tripoli) players
F.C. Famalicão players
Libyan Premier League players
Footballers from São Paulo (state)